Greece competed at the 1984 Summer Olympics in Los Angeles, United States. 63 competitors, 59 men and 4 women, took part in 49 events in 11 sports. Greek athletes have competed in every Summer Olympic Games.

Medalists

Athletics

Men's Marathon
 Michail Koussis
 Final — 2:17:38 (→ 26th place)

Men's High Jump
 Dimitrios Kattis
 Qualification — 2.15m (→ did not advance)

Men's Shot Put
 Dimitrios Koutsoukis
 Qualifying Round — 18.74 m (→ did not advance)

Women's Javelin Throw 
 Anna Verouli 
 Qualification — DSQ (→ did not advance)

Boxing

Men's Heavyweight (– 91 kg)
 Georgios Stefanopoulos
 First Round – Bye
 Second Round – Defeated Douglas Young (GBR), KO-2  
 Quarterfinals – Lost to Arnold Vanderlyde (HOL), 0:5

Cycling

Two cyclists represented Greece in 1984.

Individual road race
 Kanellos Kanellopoulos – did not finish (→ no ranking) 
 Ilias Kelesidis – did not finish (→ no ranking)

Fencing

One male fencer represented Greece in 1984.

Men's sabre
 Zisis Babanasis

Rowing

Sailing

Men

Open

Shooting

Swimming

Men's 100m Backstroke
Ilias Malamas
 Heat — 58.69 (→ did not advance, 19th place)

Kristofer Stivenson
 Heat — 58.76 (→ did not advance, 20th place)

Men's 200m Backstroke 
Kristofer Stivenson
 Heat — 2:08.38 (→ did not advance, 23rd place)

Men's 100m Butterfly
Kristofer Stivenson
 Heat — 55.46
 B-Final — 55.61 (→ 12th place)

Men's 200m Butterfly
Kristofer Stivenson
 Heat — 2:02.94 (→ did not advance, 17th place)

Women's 100m Freestyle
Sofia Dara
 Heat — 59.25 (→ did not advance, 23rd place)

Women's 200m Freestyle
Sofia Dara
 Heat — 2:09.42 (→ did not advance, 23rd place)

Women's 400m Freestyle
Sofia Dara
 Heat — 4:31.76 (→ did not advance, 20th place)

Women's 800m Freestyle 
Sophia Dara
 Heat — DNS (→ did not advance, no ranking)

Water polo

Men's Team Competition
Preliminary Round (Group B)
 Lost to United States (5-12)
 Lost to Spain (9-12)
 Drew with Brazil (9-9)
Final Round (Group E)
 Defeated Canada (11-8)
 Defeated Japan (14-7)
 Drew with Italy (8-8)
 Defeated China (10-9) → 8th place

Team Roster
 Ioannis Vossos
 Spyros Capralos
 Sotirios Stathakis
 Andreas Gounas
 Kiriakos Giannopoulos
 Aristidis Kefalogiannis
 Anastasios Papanastasiou
 Dimitrios Seletopoulos
 Antonios Aronis
 Markellos Sitarenios
 George Mavrotas
 Xenofon Moudatsios
 Stavros Giannopoulos

Weightlifting

Wrestling

References

Nations at the 1984 Summer Olympics
1984
Olympics